Goran Maznov (born 22 April 1981) is a Macedonian former football striker.

Club career
Internationally he last played for Kerkyra. Previously he changes several clubs in Russia. He also played for Republic of Macedonia. In March 2009 he was the only scorer for Tom Tomsk in the surprising away win over CSKA Moscow.

International career
He made his senior debut for Macedonia in a July 2001 friendly match against Qatar and has earned a total of 45 caps, scoring 10 goals. His final international was a June 2009 FIFA World Cup qualification match against Norway in Skopje.

References

External links
 
Profile at MacedonianFootball.com 

1981 births
Living people
Sportspeople from Strumica
Association football forwards
Macedonian footballers
North Macedonia international footballers
FK Sloga Jugomagnat players
FC Spartak Moscow players
FC Moscow players
FC Baltika Kaliningrad players
FK Rabotnički players
Diyarbakırspor footballers
K.S.C. Lokeren Oost-Vlaanderen players
FC Tom Tomsk players
A.O. Kerkyra players
FK Metalurg Skopje players
KF Shkëndija players
FK Shkupi players
FK Belasica players
Macedonian First Football League players
Russian Premier League players
Russian First League players
Süper Lig players
Belgian Pro League players
Super League Greece players
Macedonian Second Football League players
Macedonian expatriate footballers
Expatriate footballers in Russia
Macedonian expatriate sportspeople in Russia
Expatriate footballers in Turkey
Macedonian expatriate sportspeople in Turkey
Expatriate footballers in Belgium
Macedonian expatriate sportspeople in Belgium
Expatriate footballers in Greece
Macedonian expatriate sportspeople in Greece